Hulikunte is a village in Doddaballapura Taluk in Bangalore Rural district of Karnataka state, India. Hulikunte Resides in border between Nelmangala and Doddaballapura, Hulikunte also known as (Hunting)"Bete Hulikunte" because of "Bete Ranganatha Swamy" Temple here only.

Bete Ranganatha Swamy Teample

Hulikunte is a hamlet in Doddaballapura taluk. Residents here explain that the symbolic game of hunting is being played e here ever since the time of the Cholas. The Ranganathaswamy temple deity is called Bete Ranganatha (Bete: hunting in Kannada). Even today, residents finish the ritual of hunting and perform pooja at the temple. The ritual is performed at a time when the crops are harvested and grains stored in the fields before they are brought home. It appears that the hunting ritual originated when villagers would kill game that would come in search of the grains stored in the fields. There are small stretches of forested land in and around Hulikunte, and game like rabbits are known to stray into the villages. Villagers might have taken to hunting them, and today, the ritual remains, though no hunting actually takes place. Hulikunte residents take out the ancient weapons their ancestors used and march into the forest. Later, a local fair is held, and a festive atmosphere prevails in the village.

Govt Offices 
 Grama Pancyat Office, Hulikunte
 Grama Pancyat library, Hulikunte
 Village Accountant Office, Hulikunte
 Village Register's Office, Hulikunte
 BSNL Telephone Exchange Office, Hulikunte

Schools 
 Govt Higher Primary School, Hulikunte
 Government High School, Hulikunte
 Govt lower Primary School, Hulikunte colony
 Govt Higher Primary School, Katti Hosahalli
 Govt lower Primary School, Ambalagere
 Govt lower Primary School, Kasagatta
 Govt lower Primary School, Dyavasandra
 Govt lower Primary School, ChannaBasayyanaPalya
 Govt lower Primary School, Tabaranahalli
 Govt lower Primary School, Tubakunte
 Govt lower Primary School, MariHeggayyanaPalya
 Govt lower Primary School, Tuttugadahalli
 Govt lower Primary School, SeegePalya
 Govt lower Primary School, Appakaranahalli
 Govt lower Primary School, HunasePalya

Hospital 
 Primary Health Centre, Hulikunte

Veterinary Hospital 
 Govt Veterinary Hospital, Hulikunte
 Govt Veterinary Hospital, Ambalagere

Co-operative Society 
 Hulikunte Milk Producers' Co-operative Society Limited
 Hulikunte Agriculture Services Co-operative Society Limited
 Kasagatta Milk Producers' Co-operative Society Limited
 Katti Hosahalli Milk Producers' Co-operative Society Limited

References

Doddaballapura Taluk